Matteo da Siena (or Matteino) (1533 in Siena – 1588 in Rome) was an Italian painter of landscapes and buildings. He was especially noted for his frescoes in the Vatican, including the Galleria Geographical and Sala Ducale, and the Gregorian Tower (Tower of the Winds). His frescoes in the tower are known as the "Allegories of the Seasons".

References

Italian landscape painters
16th-century Italian painters
Italian male painters
1533 births
1588 deaths
Painters from Siena